Love and Hate in Dub is remix album by industrial metal band Godflesh released on 24 June 1997 through Earache Records. The remixed songs are sourced from their 1996 album Songs of Love and Hate, and they adopt a more ambient, dub and drum and bass flavor.

Background and content
Originally, Godflesh frontman Justin Broadrick wanted to get hip hop's top producers to remix the tracks for Love and Hate in Dub (which was tentatively titled Songs of Love and Hate in Dub).
This ultimately proved too expensive. As a result and unlike most remix albums, all tracks on Love and Hate in Dub were made and reworked in-house, done by Godflesh's two members, Broadrick and G. C. Green. Broadrick saw Love and Hate in Dub as a sort of response to Songs of Love and Hate, which he found "flat" in comparison. Regarding the remix album, Broadrick said:

According to Broadrick, the overall fan consensus was that Love and Hate in Dub was a step up from its source studio album, which reviewed lukewarm reviews upon release in 1996. The album begins with a KRS-One sample that, according to Broadrick, confused metal fans.

Live performance
On 4 October 1997, Godflesh performed at The Garage, London in an unusual configuration and with an unusual set list. Instead of playing guitar, Broadrick was stationed at a mixing desk (something that he would further explore more than a decade later with his JK Flesh project). Green played bass for most of the show, but, near the end, he joined Broadrick behind the desk. Steve Hough was brought in to play guitar, and Diarmuid Dalton, a frequent collaborator with Broadrick, operated a Moog synthesizer. It was at this one-off show that Love and Hate in Dub was performed.

Release and reception

On 24 June 1997, Love and Hate in Dub was released as a Digipak CD through Earache Records. In 2007, Kreation Records reissued the remix album on vinyl with tracks 4, 10, and 12 cut. In a positive review of Love and Hate in Dub, AllMusic writer Sean Cooper said, "The result is a more lithe, slithery redivision of Godflesh's metallic murk, some tracks echoing with deep, bassy drones, others pummeling away with odd rhythmic timbres and quasi-jungular patterns."

Accolades

Track listing
All songs written and remixed by Justin Broadrick and G. C. Green.

Personnel
Credits adapted from CD liner notes.

Godflesh
 G. C. Green – bass
 J. K. Broadrick – guitar, vocals
 Bryan Mantia – drums
 Machines – rhythm, samples, synth

Additional personnel
 Antz White – design
 San Kittner – photography
 Chris Oxford – photography

References

Godflesh albums
1997 EPs
1997 remix albums
Remix EPs
Earache Records remix albums
Earache Records EPs